Freilichtbühne Billerbeck  is a theatre in Billerbeck, North Rhine-Westphalia, Germany.

Theatres in North Rhine-Westphalia